Uxuma is a monotypic genus of Gabonese jumping spiders containing the single species, Uxuma impudica. It was first described by Eugène Louis Simon in 1902, and is found in Gabon.

References

Endemic fauna of Gabon
Monotypic Salticidae genera
Salticidae
Spiders of Africa